Chapter 61 is a voluntary current use program designed by the Massachusetts Legislature to tax real property in the Commonwealth of Massachusetts at its timber resources value rather than its highest and best use (development) value. Landowners who enroll their land in the program receive property tax reductions in exchange for a lien on their property. The terms of the lien require that enrolled land remain in an undeveloped state and be managed for forest resources extraction under a forest management plan approved by the state. Furthermore, the lien provides the municipal government of the town in which the enrolled property is located a right of first refusal should the landowner put the land up for sale while it is enrolled in the program. Towns may assign their right of first refusal to a state agency or a non-profit land trust. Landowners who develop their land while enrolled in the program, or for a period of time after withdrawing from the program, may be required to pay penalties.

Enrollment qualifications
In order the qualify for the Chapter 61 program, a parcel of real property must be at least  contiguous in size and under the same ownership. Prior to approval, the landowner must establish a forest management plan for the affected property and have it approved by a state certified forester. Only the wooded and undeveloped portions of the land may be enrolled in the program.

Penalties
A landowner who has enrolled in the program is forced to pay a conveyance tax if he sells his enrolled land for a use other than forestry within a period of ten years after the last date forestry was practiced on the property or within 10 years after he first acquired the property. The conveyance tax is 10% of the value of the property minus 1% for each year since the property was last been used for forestry or was acquired. 

Rollback taxes, the difference between the normal tax rate the preferential tax rate plus 5% annual interest, are charged whenever land is developed or is converted to another use not recognized by Massachusetts as forest, agricultural, or recreational in nature within five years of the last date of enrollment in the Chapter 61 program.

References

Massachusetts General Laws Chapter 61 Classification and Taxation of Forest Lands and Forest Products.